The Rutherglen Football and Netball Club is an Australian rules football and netball club playing their home games in Rutherglen, Victoria, Australia. 
The current Rutherglen FNC was created after the merger of Ovens & Murray Football League sides Rutherglen and Corowa in 1979. 
Surplus players formed the Corowa-Rutherglen FC and played in the Coreen & District Football League for 13 years.

A stint in the Ovens & King Football League followed before moving to the Tallangatta & District Football League. The club dropped the Corowa part in their name in 2002.

History

Predecessor club 

The original Rutherglen FC was established in 1877, with the first recorded match being against Wahgunyah Football Club on Wednesday, 3 June 1877. 
Football was played intermittently in the club's formative years against other local towns and districts in the late 1870s and 1880s before joining the Ovens And Murray Football Association in 1893 as one of its four original teams.
The club was based at Rutherglen's "Barkley Park" located just off Reid Street & just north-west of the town's center. 
It was a powerhouse in the Ovens And Murray Football Association during its early days competing in many finals.

The birth of the Cats (1979) 

Following the establishment of the Corowa-Rutherglen Roos in 1979, after the merger of the Corowa Spiders and the Rutherglen Redlegs, a number of surplus players decided to form the Rutherglen-Corowa Cats (known in some record books as the "Corowa-Rutherglen" Cats). Wearing a navy blue and white hooped jersey along with navy blue shorts and navy blue and white hooped socks for the majority of their history, the club would be based at Rutherglen's "Barkley Park". They joined the Coreen & District Football League, which was based around the farming districts north of Corowa, New South Wales. The club enjoyed thirteen short but successful seasons in the Coreen & District Football League winning a total of 16 Premierships across the 3 respective grades, including three senior premierships from eight grand final appearances.

After the 1991 season the club left the New South Wales based Coreen & District football League for the Victorian Ovens & King Football League, which was based around the greater Wangaratta area encompassing many former gold rush community's. They spent eleven seasons in the Ovens & King Football League, where neither the senior side nor the reserve side contested a grand final, however the Under 16's contested 4 grand finals from 1999 to 2002, claiming the club's sole premiership in 2001 over Bright by 29 points at the Tarrawingee Rec Reserve. The club officially changed its name to the "Rutherglen Football Club" in 2002, dropping the "Corowa" name 23 years after the merger. At the end of the 2003 season, the Beechworth Football Club & the Rutherglen Football Club applied for an application to join the Tallangatta & District Football League, but were refused by the Ovens and King board, so the clubs took their appeal to the Victoria Country Football League and won the appeal to join the Tallangatta & District Football League for the 2004 season.

In 2004 the club joined the Victorian Tallangatta & District Football League which is based around the small towns & farming districts near Tallangatta and every finals match being held at the Sandy Creek Oval, locally referred to as "The MCG of the Bush". Since joining the club's jersey has slightly varied to re-introduced the white monogrammed "RFC" of the Redlegs along with keeping the navy blue & white hoops of the Cats. While the club still hasn't tasted premiership success at senior or reserve levels after playing a number of final series, the club has won its first Tallangatta & District Football League Premiership when in 2007 the Under 14's defeated Yackandanda by three points. Traditionally the club does not play on the Queen's Birthday Weekend as the town hosts the annual Winery Walkabout, however, in 2016 the Corowa-Rutherglen Roos moved their OMFL  Round 11 match against the Wodonga Buldogs to Rutherglen's Barkly Park.

The club's numbers have continued to grow with each passing season including club staff, supporters, & sponsors.

Honours

Premierships and achievements

Individual honours

Team of the Century (1903-2003)

Team ref
  Corowa (1903–78)
  Rutherglen (1903–78)
  Corowa-Rutherglen (1979–2003)

Notes
 1 G. Tobias was named in the Team of the Century for his career with the Corowa FC. He was also a foundation player for the Corowa-Rutherglen FC in 1979

Hall of Famers

VFL/AFL players
From Rutherglen Corowa FNC 
Coreen & District Football League
1987 - Michael Gayfer - Collingwood
1987 - John Longmire - North Melbourne
1988 - Brett McKenzie - North Melbourne
1988 - Mark O'Donoghue - North Melbourne
1988 - Michael Garvey - Carlton Football Club
Ovens & King Football League 
2002 - Robbie Campbell - Hawthorn (2002–2009) & Melbourne (2011)

Via the AFL
1984 - Vin Doolan - North Melbourne
Nicky Winmar - St Kilda (1987-1998) & Western Bulldogs (1999)

See also
 Rutherglen Football Club (1893)
 Corowa Football Club
 Corowa-Rutherglen Football Club

Notes

References

External links
 
 Gameday website

Ovens & Murray Football League clubs
Netball teams in Victoria (Australia)
1979 establishments in Australia
Sports clubs established in 1979